João Grego (15th century) was a Portuguese explorer of the African coast. He accompanied Bartolomeu Dias in his journey around the Cape of Good Hope in 1487–88.

Portuguese explorers
15th-century explorers of Africa
15th-century Portuguese people
Maritime history of Portugal
South African explorers